The Texas Declaration of Independence was the formal declaration of independence of the Republic of Texas from Mexico in the Texas Revolution. It was adopted at the Convention of 1836 at Washington-on-the-Brazos on March 2, 1836, and was formally signed the next day after mistakes were noted in the text.

Background
In October 1835, settlers in Mexican Texas launched the Texas Revolution.

However, within Austin, many struggled with understanding what the ultimate goal of the Revolution was. Some believed that the goal should be total independence from Mexico, while others sought the reimplementation of the Mexican Constitution of 1824 which enabled freedoms, including the ownership of slaves, that were not included in the 1835 constitution of Mexico, Siete Leyes. To settle the issue, a convention was called for March 1836.

This convention differed from the previous Texas councils of 1832, 1833, and the 1835 Consultation. Many of the delegates to the 1836 convention were young citizens of the United States, who had only recently arrived in Texas, in violation of Mexico's immigration ban of April 1830, and many of them had fought in battles during the Texas Revolution against Mexico in 1835. The only two known native Texans to sign are Jose Francisco Ruiz and Jose Antonio Navarro. Most of the delegates were members of the War Party and were adamant that Texas must declare its independence from Mexico. Forty-one delegates arrived in Washington-on-the-Brazos on February 28.

Development
The convention was convened on March 1 with Richard Ellis as president. The delegates selected a committee of five to draft a declaration of independence; the committee was led by George Childress and also included Edward Conrad, James Gaines, Bailey Hardeman, and Collin McKinney. The committee submitted its draft within a mere 24 hours, leading historians to speculate that Childress had written much of it before he arrived at the Convention.

The declaration was approved on March 2 with no debate. Based primarily on the writings of John Locke and Thomas Jefferson, the declaration proclaimed that the Mexican government "ceased to protect the lives, liberty, and property of the people, from whom its legitimate powers are derived" and complained about "arbitrary acts of oppression and tyranny." Throughout the declaration are numerous references to the United States laws, rights, and customs. Omitted from the declaration was the fact that the author and many of the signatories were citizens of the United States, occupying Texas illegally, and therefore had no legal rights in the governance of Mexico. The declaration clarifies that the men were accustomed to the laws and privileges of the United States, and were unfamiliar with the language, religion, and traditions of the nation that they were rebelling against.

The declaration officially established the Republic of Texas, although it was not officially recognized at that time by any government other than itself. The Mexican Republic still claimed the land and considered the delegates to be invaders, and the United States didn't recognize it since that would be an act of war against Mexico.

Among others, the declaration mentions the following reasons for the separation:

 The 1824 Constitution of Mexico establishing a federal republic had been overturned and changed into a centralist military dictatorship by Gen. Antonio López de Santa Anna. (From Mexico's viewpoint, lawful elections of 1835 seated many conservative politicians who intended to strengthen Mexico's republic government and defend their nation from an invasion of illegal American immigrants. They amended the 1824 constitution by passing the Seven Laws.)
 The Mexican government had invited settlers to Texas and promised them constitutional liberty and republican government, but then reneged on these guarantees. (It did not mention that many settlers, including the author and majority of signatories, were factually uninvited, illegal trespassers.)
 Texas was in union with the Mexican state of Coahuila as Coahuila y Tejas, with the capital in distant Saltillo. Thus the affairs of Texas were decided at a great distance from the province and in the Spanish language, which the immigrants called "an unknown tongue."
 Political rights to which the settlers had previously been accustomed in the United States, such as the right to keep and bear arms and the right to trial by jury, were denied. 
 No system of public education had been established.
 Attempts by the Mexican government to enforce import tariffs were called "piratical attacks" by "foreign desperadoes."
 The settlers were not allowed freedom of religion. All legal settlers were required to convert to Catholicism.

Based upon the United States Declaration of Independence, the Texas Declaration also contains many memorable expressions of American political principles:

"the right of trial by jury, that palladium of civil liberty, and only safe guarantee for the life, liberty, and property of the citizen."
"our arms ... are essential to our defense, the rightful property of freemen, and formidable only to tyrannical governments."

Signatories

Sixty men signed the Texas Declaration of Independence. Three of them were born in Mexico. Fifty-seven of the sixty moved to Texas from the United States. Ten of them had lived in Texas for more than six years, while one-quarter of them had been in the province for less than a year. This is significant, because it indicates that the majority of signatories had moved to Texas after the Law of April 6, 1830, banning immigration, had taken effect, meaning that the majority were legally citizens of the United States, occupying Texas illegally. Fifty-nine of these men were delegates to the Convention, and one was the Convention Secretary, Herbert S. Kimble, who was not a delegate.

Jesse B. Badgett
George Washington Barnett
Thomas Barnett
Stephen W. Blount
John W. Bower
Asa Brigham
Andrew Briscoe
John Wheeler Bunton
John S. D. Byrom
Mathew Caldwell
Samuel Price Carson
George C. Childress
William Clark, Jr.
Robert M. Coleman
James Collinsworth
 Edward Conrad
 William Carroll Crawford
Lorenzo de Zavala
Richard Ellis, President of the Convention and Delegate from Red River
Stephen H. Everett
John Fisher
Samuel Rhoads Fisher
Robert Thomas 'James' Gaines
Thomas J. Gazley
Benjamin Briggs Goodrich
Jesse Grimes
Robert Hamilton
Bailey Hardeman
Augustine B. Hardin
Sam Houston
Herbert Simms Kimble, Secretary
William D. Lacy
Albert Hamilton Latimer
Edwin O. Legrand
Collin McKinney
Samuel A. Maverick (from Bejar)
Michel B. Menard
William Menefee
John W. Moore
William Motley
José Antonio Navarro
Martin Parmer, Delegate from San Augustine
Sydney O. Pennington
Robert Potter
James Power
John S. Roberts
Sterling C. Robertson
José Francisco Ruiz
Thomas Jefferson Rusk
William. B. Scates
George W. Smyth
Elijah Stapp, ancestor of Brown family
Charles B. Stewart
James G. Swisher
Charles S. Taylor
David Thomas
John Turner
Edwin Waller
Claiborne West
James B. Woods

See also
Texas Independence Day
Timeline of the Republic of Texas
Declaration of Independence (1836)

Notes

References

External links

Washington on the Brazos
The Declaration of Independence, 1836, from Gammel's Laws of Texas, Vol. I., hosted by the Portal to Texas History.
Declaration of Independence of Texas, 1836 broadside and original manuscript at the Texas State Library and Archives Commission
Texas Independence Day, March 2 including Samuel A. Maverick's broadside copy of the Texas Declaration of Independence. 
Lone Star Junction Site: copy of The Declaration of Independence, March 2, 1836
Special Report: Texas Independence Day by Texas Cooking

School Lesson: Texas Declaration of Independence
 Descendants of the Signers of the Texas Declaration of Independence

Declarations of independence
Texas Revolution
1836 in law
1836 in the Republic of Texas
Sam Houston
March 1836 events
1836 documents